Duty and Desire is a 2004 historical romance novel by Pamela Aidan. The second in the Fitzwilliam Darcy, Gentleman trilogy, the novel examines Jane Austen's 1813 Pride and Prejudice from the perspective of Fitzwilliam Darcy, the central male character of that novel.

Plot summary

In relation to Pride and Prejudice, on which the novel is based, Duty and Desire takes place between Darcy's initial leaving of Hertfordshire and his reappearance in Pride'''s narrative at Rosings Park. Following on from the events of An Assembly Such as This, the novel opens with Fitzwilliam Darcy preparing for the Christmas season with his extended family. Several events have conspired to trouble him, however; as well as his ongoing self-examination of his romantic feelings towards Elizabeth Bennet (who does not appear in the novel, but remains a significant background presence throughout), his sister Georgiana is swiftly recovering from her ill-treatment at the hands of George Wickham by embracing an interest in religion, something encouraged by her new governess Mrs. Annesley but which bemuses and troubles Darcy. Furthermore, Darcy's well-meaning attempts to dissuade his friend Charles Bingley from what Darcy sees as his ill-fated and unrequited romance with Elizabeth's sister Jane are forcing Darcy to resort to underhanded and deceitful tactics that Darcy considers unworthy of himself.

Darcy finally decides that he needs a wife, and resolves to find a woman like Elizabeth Bennet from within his own social sphere, thus banishing any lingering feelings he has for her. To that end, he accepts the invitation of Lord Sayre, an old university friend for a week's stay at Sayre's family estate, Norwycke Castle, hoping to find a suitable wife amongst the party gathered there. Accompanied by his loyal valet Fletcher, he soon discovers that the members of the party he is joining are scheming, unscrupulous and not entirely what they seem, and that Sayre himself is a gambling addict who has almost gambled away his entire family estate. Despite this, he finds himself almost drawn with unusual passion to Sayre's disliked half-sister, Lady Sylvanie, who appears to share many of Elizabeth Bennet's charms and characteristics.

During Darcy's stay at Norwycke, however, numerous unusual and increasingly sinister events begin to occur; many of Darcy's possessions are stolen or interfered with within his room, the ritualistically slain body of a baby pig is found at a nearby collection of stones imbued with great supernatural and superstitious importance by the locals, and a local child is kidnapped. Darcy and Fletcher, investigating the unusual circumstances, discover that Sayre (who is almost bankrupt) is desperate to have Lady Sylvanie married to Darcy to inherit the estate of his hated and now-deceased stepmother, and Sylvanie herself - who believes herself able to use charms and spells to direct men to follow her will - is herself eager to gain revenge on Sayre, who ruined her and her mother. Darcy manages to untangle himself from their various schemes and uncovers the culprit behind the recent goings-on - Sayre's stepmother, the former Lady Sayre, who was alive all the time and has been manipulating her daughter in an attempt to destroy her stepson. Revealed, Lady Sayre kills herself, but not before forcing Darcy to face his own darker nature and his deeply hidden desires for revenge on George Wickham. Even more unsettled than when he started, Darcy swears off trying to find a wife within his own sphere, leaving him once more alone with his complicated feelings for Elizabeth.

Relationship to Pride and PrejudiceDuty and Desire takes place during Mr. Darcy's long absence from the plot of Pride and Prejudice'', and is the most thematically independent of the "Gentleman" trilogy.  Most of the plot and action are purely the invention of Pamela Aiden.  However, most of the issues Darcy encounters—his struggle to understand and help his sister, his realisation of who his real friends are, his failure to interest himself in other women—are crucial to his future success in reaching out to Elizabeth.

References to historical people, places and events
In the novel a stone circle located near Norwycke Castle is known as either the "King's Men" or the "Whispering Knights", the former name being an attempt by a recent owner of the land to obscure the old legends surrounding the circle.  It is at the circle where Darcy finds a grisly package that resembles a sacrificed child.

The location is based on a megalithic monument known as the Rollright Stones which has two formations, called "The King's Men" and "The Whispering Knights" respectively.  The legends described in the novel are similar to the legends surrounding the "Whispering Knights".  There is also a reference to the nearby town of Chipping Norton.

At the beginning of the novel, Georgiana Darcy receives a Christmas present from her aunt of a novel about "a mother and her three daughters...cast out upon the world by a heartless stepson and his odious wife".  Darcy's uncle expresses his hope that "'Sense' is vindicated and 'Sensibility' reproved."  Jane Austen's first published novel, Sense and Sensibility, appeared in 1811, when the events of this novel are set.

At Darcy's London house the staff are alarmed by reports of people "murdered in their beds" in Wapping.  This is a reference to the Ratcliff Highway murders.

See also

 List of literary adaptations of Pride and Prejudice

References

2004 British novels
American historical novels
American romance novels
Novels based on Pride and Prejudice
Historical romance novels
2004 American novels